The 1985 The Winston, the inaugural running of the NASCAR All-Star Race, was a stock car racing competition that took place on May 25, 1985. Held at Charlotte Motor Speedway in Concord, North Carolina, the 70-lap race was the second exhibition race in the 1985 NASCAR Winston Cup Series.

The race featured one two-tire pit stop between laps 30 and 40, and was held the day before the Coca-Cola World 600.

Background

The Winston was open to race winners from the 1984 season. The pole position was awarded to the defending Winston Cup champion while the rest of the field was determined by the total number of wins from last season, with driver's points used as the tiebreaker.

1985 The Winston drivers and eligibility

Race winners in 1984
3-Dale Earnhardt (2 wins)
5-Geoff Bodine (3 wins)
9-Bill Elliott (3 wins)
11-Darrell Waltrip (7 wins)
15-Ricky Rudd (1 win)
22-Bobby Allison (2 wins)
27-Tim Richmond (1 win)
28-Cale Yarborough (3 wins, including the 1984 Daytona 500)
33-Harry Gant (3 wins)
43-Richard Petty (2 wins)
44-Terry Labonte (2 wins, defending 1984 champion)
55-Benny Parsons (1 win)

Race summary
The earnings were as follows:

Chevrolet Monte Carlo drivers Terry Labonte and Darrell Waltrip led the field on the green flag. Despite having an advantage in aerodynamics, the Ford Thunderbird drivers struggled to keep up with the Chevys, which were in the top five. By lap 8, Dale Earnhardt slipped out of the top five as Cale Yarborough and Bobby Allison passed him while Waltrip and Labonte battled for the lead. On lap 14, Geoff Bodine entered pit road and retired from the race due to engine failure, becoming the only DNF in the race. Labonte passed Waltrip on the start/finish line to lead lap 20 and earn  before surrendering the lead back to Waltrip. Harry Gant caught up with Waltrip before the two-tire pit stops began on lap 30. By lap 38, Gant took the lead from Waltrip and earned  for leading lap 50. Gant dominated the race by leading 31 laps, but Waltrip regained momentum and took back the lead on lap 69 to win the race and  just before his engine expired.

References

Winston, The
Winston, The
NASCAR races at Charlotte Motor Speedway
NASCAR All-Star Race